The Women's Super League Grand Final is the championship-deciding game of rugby league's RFL Women's Super League competition.

History
After the formation of the Women's Super League in 2017 it was announced that the title would be decided by a playoff series and Grand Final as the men's competition does as well. The first two Grand Finals were held at the Manchester Regional Arena on the same day and before the men's Grand Final. For 2019 it was announced Headingley Stadium would host the final. However a late date change meant a change of venue as Headingley was unavailable for the new date and the 2019 grand final was played at the Totally Wicked Stadium instead.

The 2021 final will be played at Headingley as a double header preceded by the Shield final.

Finals

See also

NRL Women's Grand Final

References

Grand
2017 establishments in England
Rugby league club matches
Grand finals